The Oxford Gazette may refer to:

 The Oxford University Gazette, the publication of record for the University of Oxford
 The Oxford Gazette, former name of The London Gazette
 Oxford Gazette, former name of Reading Mercury